Saison Khounsamnam (born 13 January 1993) is a Laotian professional footballer who currently plays as a defender for Master 7 FC in the Lao League 1. Season 2021

International career
Saison Khounsamnan played for the Laos U-23 team and also the Laos national football team.

External links

References

1993 births
Living people
Laotian footballers
Laos international footballers
Association football defenders
Yotha F.C. players
Place of birth missing (living people)
Footballers at the 2014 Asian Games
Asian Games competitors for Laos